The 2005 NCAA Division I Women's Tennis Championships were the 24th annual tournaments to determine the national champions of NCAA Division I women's singles, doubles, and team collegiate tennis in the United States.

Defending champions Stanford defeated Texas in the team final, 4–0, to claim their fourteenth national title, the Cardinal's sixth title in nine years.

Host
This year's tournaments were hosted by the University of Georgia at the Dan Magill Tennis Complex in Athens, Georgia, the final separate women's tournament. Starting in 2006, the men's and women's NCAA championships would be held jointly.

See also
NCAA Division II Tennis Championships (Men, Women)
NCAA Division III Tennis Championships (Men, Women)

References

External links
List of NCAA Women's Tennis Champions

NCAA Division I tennis championships
NCAA Division I Tennis Championships
NCAA Division I Tennis Championships
NCAA Division I Women's Tennis Championships